Rosedale Golf Club is a private golf club in Toronto, founded in 1893 in Moore Park. The course hosted the Canadian Open in 1912 and 1928.

History

Founded in 1893 in Moore Park as a 9-hole course and moved to Rosedale, Toronto in 1895–1896 on what is now Rosedale Field. It was an eighteen hole course on 15 acres that ran along Highland Avenue from just west of the Rosedale Field to as far as Glen Road and just north of Summerhill Avenue.

This location was short-lived as the land was owned by The Scottish Ontario and Manitoba Land Company and the area was being acquired to become a residential development called North Rosedale.

In 1909, the course moved north along the Don River to its current site between the neighbourhoods of Teddington Park to the west, Lawrence Park to the south, The Bridle Path to the east and Hoggs Hollow to the north.

Controversy

In 2004 the club was sued by McDonald's Canada chairman and CEO George Cohon who alleged that the club rejected his membership application due to his Jewish heritage.

Tournaments

The club has hosted several tournaments including the Canadian Open in 1912 and 1928. In more recent years, the club has elected to only host tournaments that cause little disruption to the membership.  The course record of 63 is held jointly by Greg Norman and former Rosedale assistant pro, Lorne Rowe.

Current course
The present course was initially designed by the American designer Tom Bendelow, but within a decade was re-worked by golf course architect Donald Ross.  It plays to par 71 (73 for ladies) and is 6,525 yards in length. Each hole on the course is distinctive, with water in play on 9 of the 18 holes, big elevation changes and tight, rolling fairways.  Because of its exclusivity, Rosedale has not been played by many golf writers or professionals, and therefore does not appear on many of the golf course ranking lists; however, those who have played the course rank it as one of the best "classic" golf courses in Canada.

See also
Other clubs in Toronto:
 Lambton Golf Club
 Scarboro Golf and Country Club
 St. George's Golf and Country Club
 Toronto Golf Club

References

External links
 Home of the Game
 Teddington Park
Rosedale Golf Club
George Seymour Lyon

Golf clubs and courses in Ontario
Sport in Toronto
Sports venues in Toronto
Clubs and societies based in Toronto